A Gentleman and His Music is an album by saxophonist/composer Benny Carter recorded in 1985 and released by the Concord label.

Reception

AllMusic reviewer Scott Yanow stated "For this 1985 session, altoist Benny Carter (then a week short of turning 78 years old) is teamed with the lyrical trumpeter Joe Wilder and the Concord All-Stars .... The results are predictably excellent with the septet swinging with spirit and creativity on four standards, a blues and Carter's original 'A Kiss from You.' This album is well worth tracking down".

Track listing
 "Sometimes I'm Happy" (Vincent Youmans, Irving Caesar) – 7:39	
 "A Kiss from You" (Benny Carter, Johnny Mercer) – 6:15
 "Blues for George" (Carter) – 8:09
 "Things Ain't What They Used to Be" (Mercer Ellington, Ted Persons) – 9:53
 "Lover Man" (Jimmy Sherman, Jimmy Davis, Ram Ramirez) – 7:28
 "Idaho" (Jesse Stone) – 8:00

Personnel 
Benny Carter – alto saxophone
Scott Hamilton - tenor saxophone
Joe Wilder – trumpet, flugelhorn
Ed Bickert – electric guitar
Gene Harris – piano
John Clayton – bass
Jimmie Smith – drums

References 

1985 albums
Benny Carter albums
Concord Records albums